Perniola is an Italian surname. Notable people with the surname include:

Mario Perniola (1941–2018), Italian philosopher and writer
Michele Perniola (born 1998), Italian singer

Italian-language surnames